Eugène Marcel Prévost (1 May 18628 April 1941) was a French author  and dramatist.

Biography

Prévost was born in Paris on 1 May 1862, and educated at Jesuit schools in Bordeaux and Paris, entering the École polytechnique in 1882. He published a story in the Le Clairon as early as 1881, but for some years after the completion of his studies he applied his technical knowledge to the manufacture of tobacco.

He published in succession, Le Scorpion (1887), Chonchette (1888), Mademoiselle Jaufre (1889), Cousine Laura (1890), La Confession d'un amant (1891), Lettres de femmes (1892), L'Automne d'une femme (1893), and in 1894 he made a great sensation by a study of the results of Parisian education and Parisian society on young girls, Les Demi-vierges, which was dramatized and produced with great success at the Gymnase on 21 May 1895. Le Jardin secret appeared in 1897; and in 1900 Les Vierges fortes, and a study of the question of women's education and independence in two novels Frédérique and Léa.

L'Heureux ménage (1901), Les Lettres à Françoise (1902), La Princesse d'Erminge (1904), and L'Accordeur aveugle (1905) are among his later novels. A picture of modern German manners is given in his Monsieur et Madame Moloch (1906). He had a great success in 1904 with a four-act play La Plus faible, produced at the Comédie-Française.

Prévost was elected to the Académie française in 1909.

He died on 8 April 1941, aged 78.

References

External links 
 
  
 

1862 births
1941 deaths
Writers from Paris
Members of the Académie Française
École Polytechnique alumni
French male writers